Mohamed Abdullah (born 1973) is an Emirati swimmer. He competed in six events at the 1988 Summer Olympics.

References

External links

1973 births
Living people
Emirati male swimmers
Olympic swimmers of the United Arab Emirates
Swimmers at the 1988 Summer Olympics
Place of birth missing (living people)